Gaiman Department is a  department of Chubut Province in Argentina.

The provincial subdivision has a population of about 9,612 inhabitants in an area of 11,076 km², and its capital city is Gaiman, which is located around 1,398 km from the Capital federal.

Settlements
 Villa Dique Florentino Ameghino
 Dolavon
 Gaiman
 Las Chapas
 Bryn Gwyn
 28 de Julio

External links
Gaiman website 
Federal website  

Departments of Chubut Province